Fever Pitch, subtitled "A Fan's Life", is a 1992 book by Nick Hornby.

Fever Pitch may also refer to:

Films
 Fever Pitch (1985 film), an American drama starring Ryan O'Neal
 Fever Pitch (1997 film), a British adaptation of Hornby's book, starring Colin Firth
 Fever Pitch (2005 film), an American adaptation of the 1997 film, starring Jimmy Fallon and Drew Barrymore

Others 
 Fever Pitch (comics), a fictional villain in the Marvel Comics universe
 Fever Pitch Soccer, a 1995 video game
 Fever Pitch (album), the official soundtrack to the 2002 FIFA World Cup
 Fever Pitch (TV series), a 2017 Australian television comedy panel show